Judea or Judaea ( or ; from , Standard Yəhūda, Tiberian Yehūḏā; ,) is a mountainous region in the southern part of the modern States of Palestine and Israel.

The name is an ancient, historic, Biblical Hebrew, contemporaneous Latin, and modern-day term originating from the Hebrew name Yehudah, a son of the biblical patriarch Jacob/Israel, with Yehudah's progeny forming the biblical Israelite tribe of Judah (Yehudah) and later the associated Kingdom of Judah.

Related nomenclature continued to be used by the Babylonians, Persian, Hellenistic, and Roman periods as the Babylonian and Persian Yehud, Hasmonean Kingdom of Judea, and consequently Herodian and Roman Judea, respectively. Under Hasmonean, Herodian and Roman rule, the term was applied to an area larger than the historical region of Judea. In 132 AD, the province of Judaea was merged with Galilee into an enlarged province named Syria Palaestina.

The term Judea was revived by the Israeli government in the 20th century as part of the Israeli administrative district name Judea and Samaria Area for the territory generally referred to as the West Bank.

Etymology
The name  Judea is a Greek and Roman adaptation of the name "Judah", which originally encompassed the territory of the Israelite tribe of that name and later of the ancient Kingdom of Judah. Nimrud Tablet K.3751, dated c. 733 BCE, is the earliest known record of the name Judah (written in Assyrian cuneiform as Yaudaya or KUR.ia-ú-da-a-a).

Judea was sometimes used as the name for the entire region, including parts beyond the river Jordan. In 200 CE Sextus Julius Africanus, cited by Eusebius (Church History 1.7.14), described "Nazara" (Nazareth) as a village in Judea. The King James Version of the Bible refers to the region as "Jewry".

"Judea" was a name used by English speakers for the hilly internal part of Mandatory Palestine until the Jordanian rule of the area in 1948. For example, the borders of the two states to be established according to the UN's 1947 partition scheme were officially described using the terms "Judea" and "Samaria" and in its reports to the League of Nations Mandatory Committee, as in 1937, the geographical terms employed were "Samaria and Judea". Jordan called the area ad-difa’a al-gharbiya (translated into English as the "West Bank"). "Yehuda" is the Hebrew term used for the area in modern Israel since the region was captured and occupied by Israel in 1967.

Historical boundaries

Roman-period definition 
The first century Roman-Jewish historian Josephus wrote (The Jewish War 3.3.5):In the limits of Samaria and Judea lies the village Anuath, which is also named Borceos. This is the northern boundary of Judea. The southern parts of Judea, if they be measured lengthways, are bounded by a village adjoining to the confines of Arabia; the Jews that dwell there call it Jordan. However, its breadth is extended from the river Jordan to Joppa. The city Jerusalem is situated in the very middle; on which account some have, with sagacity enough, called that city the Navel of the country. Nor indeed is Judea destitute of such delights as come from the sea, since its maritime places extend as far as Ptolemais: it was parted into eleven portions, of which the royal city Jerusalem was the supreme, and presided over all the neighboring country, as the head does over the body. As to the other cities that were inferior to it, they presided over their several toparchies; Gophna was the second of those cities, and next to that Acrabatta, after them Thamna, and Lydda, and Emmaus, and Pella, and Idumea, and Engaddi, and Herodium, and Jericho; and after them came Jamnia and Joppa, as presiding over the neighboring people; and besides these there was the region of Gamala, and Gaulonitis, and Batanea, and Trachonitis, which are also parts of the kingdom of Agrippa. This [last] country begins at Mount Libanus, and the fountains of Jordan, and reaches breadthways to Lake Tiberias; and in length is extended from a village called Arpha, as far as Julias. Its inhabitants are a mixture of Jews and Syrians. And thus have I, with all possible brevity, described the country of Judea, and those that lie round about it.

Elsewhere, Josephus wrote that "Arabia is a country that borders on Judea."

Geography

Judea is a mountainous region, part of which is considered a desert. The climate, accordingly, moves between Mediterranean in the west and desert climate in the east, with a strip of steppe climate in the middle. Major urban areas in the region include Jerusalem, Bethlehem, Gush Etzion, Jericho and Hebron.

Geographers divide Judea into several regions: the Hebron hills, the Jerusalem saddle, the Bethel hills and the Judean desert east of Jerusalem, which descends in a series of steps to the Dead Sea. The hills are distinct for their anticline structure. In ancient times the hills were forested, and the Bible records agriculture and sheep farming being practiced in the area. Animals are still grazed today, with shepherds moving them between the low ground to the hilltops as summer approaches, while the slopes are still layered with centuries-old stone terracing. The Jewish Revolt against the Romans ended in the devastation of vast areas of the Judean countryside.

Mount Hazor marks the geographical boundary between Samaria to its north and Judea to its south.

Biblical patriarchs narrative
Judea is central to much of the narrative of the Torah, with the Patriarchs Abraham, Isaac and Jacob said to have been buried at Hebron in the Tomb of the Patriarchs.

History

Iron Age, Assyrian, and Babylonian period

The early history of Judah is uncertain; the biblical account states that the Kingdom of Judah, along with the Kingdom of Israel, was a successor to a united monarchy of Israel and Judah, but modern scholarship generally holds that the united monarchy is ahistorical. Regardless, the Northern Kingdom was conquered by the Neo-Assyrian Empire in 720 BCE. The Kingdom of Judah remained nominally independent, but paid tribute to the Assyrian Empire from 715 and throughout the first half of the 7th century BCE, regaining its independence as the Assyrian Empire declined after 640 BCE, but after 609 again fell under the sway of imperial rule, this time paying tribute at first to the Egyptians and after 601 BCE to the Neo-Babylonian Empire, until 586 BCE, when it was finally conquered by Babylonia.

Persian and Hellenistic periods

The Babylonian Empire fell to the conquests of Cyrus the Great in 539 BCE. Judea remained under Persian rule until the conquest of Alexander the Great in 332 BCE, eventually falling under the rule of the Hellenistic Seleucid Empire until the revolt of Judas Maccabeus resulted in the Hasmonean dynasty of kings who ruled in Judea for over a century.

Roman period

Judea lost its independence to the Romans in the 1st century BCE, becoming first a tributary kingdom, then a province, of the Roman Empire. The Romans had allied themselves to the Maccabees and interfered again in 63 BCE, at the end of the Third Mithridatic War, when the proconsul Pompeius Magnus ("Pompey the Great") stayed behind to make the area secure for Rome, including his siege of Jerusalem in 63 BCE. Queen Salome Alexandra had recently died, and a civil war broke out between her sons, Hyrcanus II and Aristobulus II. Pompeius restored Hyrcanus but political rule passed to the Herodian family who ruled as client kings. In 6 CE, Judea came under direct Roman rule as the southern part of the province of Iudaea, although Jews living in the province still maintained some form of independence and could judge offenders by their own laws, including capital offences, until c. 28 CE. The Province of Judea, during the late Hellenistic period and early Roman period was also divided into five conclaves: Jerusalem (ירושלם), Gadara (גדרה), Amathus (עמתו), Jericho (יריחו), and Sepphoris (צפורין), and during the Roman period had eleven administrative districts (toparchies): Jerusalem, Gophna, Akrabatta, Thamna, Lydda, Ammaus, Pella, Idumaea, Engaddi, Herodeion, and Jericho.

Eventually, the Jewish population rose against Roman rule in 66 CE in a revolt that was unsuccessful. Jerusalem was besieged in 70 CE and much of the population was killed or enslaved.

70 years later the Jewish population revolted under the leadership of Simon bar Kokhba and established the last Kingdom of Israel, which lasted three years, before the Romans managed to conquer the province for good, at a high cost in terms of manpower and expense.

After the defeat of Bar Kokhba (132–135 CE) the Roman Emperor Hadrian was determined to wipe out the identity of Israel-Judah-Judea, and renamed it Syria Palaestina. Until that time the area had been called the "province of Judaea" by the Romans. At the same time, he changed the name of the city of Jerusalem to Aelia Capitolina. The suppression of the Bar Kokhba revolt led to widespread destruction and displacement throughout Judea, the expulsion of Jews from the territory surrounding Jerusalem, and the penetration of pagan populations. However, there was never a complete Jewish abandonment of the area, and Jews have been an important (and sometimes persecuted) minority in the fringes of Judea since that time, as Jewish communities continued to live in the coastal plain, around Lod, and in the southern Hebron Hills.

Byzantine period

The Byzantines redrew the borders of the land of Palestine. The various Roman provinces (Syria Palaestina, Samaria, Galilee, and Peraea) were reorganized into three dioceses of Palaestina, reverting to the name first used by Greek historian Herodotus in the mid-5th century BCE: Palaestina Prima, Secunda, and Tertia or Salutaris (First, Second, and Third Palestine), part of the Diocese of the East. Palaestina Prima consisted of Judea, Samaria, the Paralia, and Peraea with the governor residing in Caesarea. Palaestina Secunda consisted of Galilee, the lower Jezreel Valley, the regions east of Galilee, and the western part of the former Decapolis with the seat of government at Scythopolis. Palaestina Tertia included the Negev, southern Jordan—once part of Arabia—and most of Sinai, with Petra as the usual residence of the governor. Palestina Tertia was also known as Palaestina Salutaris. According to historian H.H. Ben-Sasson, this reorganisation took place under Diocletian (284–305), although other scholars suggest this change occurred later, in 390.

Crusader period 
According to Ellenblum, the Franks tended to settle in the southern half of the region between Jerusalem and Nablus since there was a sizable Christian population there.

Mamluk period 
Most of the people living in the northern portion of Judea in the late 16th century were Muslims; some of them resided in towns that today have significant Christian populations. According to the 1596–1597 Ottoman census, Birzeit and Jifna, for instance, were wholly Muslim villages, while Taybeh had 63 Muslim families and 23 Christian families. There were 71 Christian families and 9 Muslim families in Ramallah, although the Christians there were recent arrivals who had moved from the Kerak area only a few years previously. According to Ehrlich, the region's Christian population decreased as a result of a combination of factors including impoverishment, oppression, marginalization, and persecution. Sufi activity took place in Jerusalem and the surrounding area, which most likely pushed Christian villagers in the region to convert to Islam.

Timeline
 Around 900–586 BCE: Kingdom of Judah
 586–539 BCE: Yehud, Babylonian Empire
 539–332 BCE: Yehud Medinata, Persian Empire
 332–305 BCE: Macedonian Empire of Alexander the Great
 305–198 BCE: Ptolemaic Egypt
 198–141 BCE: Seleucid Empire
 141–37 BCE: The Hasmonean kingdom established by the Maccabees, under the Roman Empire after 63 BCE
 63 BCE: Pompey's conquest of Jerusalem
 37 BCE – 132 CE: Herodian dynasty ruling Judea as a vassal state of the Roman Empire (37–4 BCE Herod the Great, 4 BCE – 6 CE Herod Archelaus, 41–44 CE Agrippa I), interchanging with direct Roman rule (6–41, 44–132)
 c. 25 BCE: Caesarea Maritima is built by Herod the Great, replacing Jerusalem as the capital
 6 CE the Roman Empire deposed Herod Archelaus and converted his territory into the Roman province of Judea.
 Census of Quirinius, too late to correspond to census related to Jesus' birth
 26–36: Pontius Pilate prefect of Roman Judea during the Crucifixion of Jesus
 66–73: First Jewish–Roman War, includes Destruction of the Second Temple in 70
 115–117: Kitos War
 132: Judea was merged with Galilee into the enlarged province of Syria Palaestina.

Selected towns and cities
Judea, in the generic sense, also incorporates places in Galilee and in Samaria.

See also 
 Timeline of the name "Judea"
 Seleucid Empire vs. Maccabean Revolt
 History of Palestine
 Ioudaios
 Kitos War
 Judaea (Roman province)
 State of Judea

References

External links

 Judea and civil war
 The subjugation of Judea
 Judaea 6–66 CE 
 Judea photos
 The Jewish History Resource Center—Project of the Dinur Center for Research in Jewish History, Hebrew University of Jerusalem

 
Historical regions in Israel
Geography of the State of Palestine
Hebrew Bible regions
New Testament regions
West Bank